Miss Universe 1963, the 12th Miss Universe pageant, was held on 20 July 1963 at the Miami Beach Auditorium in Miami Beach, Florida, United States. Iêda Maria Vargas of Brazil was crowned the winner by outgoing titleholder Norma Nolan of Argentina. This marks the first time that a Miss Universe titleholder marks the same placement as the 1962 World Cup champion. Fifty countries and territories participated.

Results

Placements

Contestants

  - Olga Galuzzi
  - Gertrude Bergner
  - Sandra Louise Young
  - Irene Godin
   - Ana María Velasco Gutiérrez
  - Iêda Maria Vargas
  - Gloria Blackman-Miller
  - Jane Kmita
  - Manel De Silva
  - María Cristina Álvarez González
  - Sandra Chrysopulos Morúa
  - Alicia Margit Chia
  - Philomena Zielinski
  - Aino Korva
  - Carmen Benicia Abinader de Benito
  - Patricia Córdova
  - Riitta Anja Hellevi Kautiainen
  - Monique Lemaire
  - Helga Carla Ziesemer
  - Despina Orgeta
  - Else Onstenk
  - Theódóra Þórðardóttir
  - Marlene McKeown
  - Sherin Ibrahim
  - Gianna Serra
  - June Maxine Bowman
  - Noriko Ando
  - Kim Myoung-ja
  - Mia Dahm
  - Selma Rahal
  - Regina Ellen Scandrett
  - Leda Sánchez
  - Eva Carlberg
  Okinawa - Reiko Uehara
  - Amelia Benítez
  - Dora Toledano Godier
  - Lalaine Marlotte Betia Bennett
  - Jeanette Blascoechea
  - Grace Calder W.Taylor
  - Ellen Liebenberg
  - María Rosa Pérez Gómez
  - Brigida Hagens
  - Kerstin Margareta Jonsson
  - Diane Tanner
  - Jean Stoddart
  - Guler Samuray
  - Marite Ozers
  - Graciela Pintos
  - Irene Morales Machado
  - Maureen Thomas

Notes

Did not compete
  - Enid Marugg
  - Hazel Eastmond
  - Francine Marcos (arrived late)
  - Susan Pratt (arrived but had a car accident, stayed in the pageant but didn't compete)
  - Cheung Yen Ping
  - Mona Slim
  Macau - Ying Yun Hiu
  - Nik Azizah Yahya
  - Beatriz Martinez Solorzano
  - Ana Cecilia Maruri
  - Ruby Thelma Bacot
  - Maria Penedo
  - Noela Bernardino

Awards
  - Miss Amity (Grace Taylor)
  - Miss Photogenic (Marlene McKeown)
  - Best National Costume (Sherin Ibrahim)

General references

1963
1963 in Florida
1963 beauty pageants
Beauty pageants in the United States
Events in Miami Beach, Florida
July 1963 events in the United States